Yuzuru is a masculine Japanese given name.

Possible writings
Yuzuru can be written using different kanji characters. Here are some examples: 

譲, "transfer"
巽, "to obey" or "southeast" (from I Ching)
遜, "modest"
結弦, "connect, string of musical instrument"

The name can also be written in hiragana ゆずる or katakana ユズル.

Notable people with the name

, Japanese voice actor
, Japanese figure skater
, Japanese skeleton racer
, Japanese naval officer
, Japanese volleyball player
Yuzuru Ito, Japanese founder of Achieving Competitive Excellence 
Yuzuru Kojima (born 1938), Canadian judoka 
, Japanese footballer 
, Japanese footballer
, Japanese director
, Japanese footballer

Separately, yūzuru (夕鶴) means evening crane and is the name of a popular Japanese opera. 

Japanese masculine given names